The Military ranks of Ethiopia are the military insignia used by the Ethiopian National Defense Force (ENDF). While Ethiopia is a landlocked country, it is in the process of reestablishing a Blue-water navy. On 8 January 2022, the rank of field marshal general was awarded for the first time to Birhanu Jula. At the same time, new ranks were introduced to the ENDF.

Commissioned officer ranks
The rank insignia of commissioned officers.

Other ranks
The rank insignia of non-commissioned officers and enlisted personnel.

Historic ranks

Commissioned officer ranks
The rank insignia of commissioned officers.

Other ranks
The rank insignia of non-commissioned officers and enlisted personnel.

References

External links
 

Ethiopia
Military of Ethiopia